Kobus Moolman (1964) is a South African poet.

He has published eight volumes of poetry, a collection of radio plays, and is an Associate Professor of Creative Writing, and the coordinator of the Creative Writing programme in the English department at the University of the Western Cape. Previously, he taught creative writing at the University of KwaZulu-Natal in Durban. His collection, Time like Stone, won the Ingrid Jonker Prize for 2001.

Published Works

Poetry 
Time like Stone (2001)
Feet of the Sky (2003)
Separating the Seas (2007)
Anatomy (2008)
Light and After (2010)
Left Over (2014)
A Book of Rooms (2014)
The Mountain behind the House (2020)

Story Collections 

 The Swimming Lesson and Other Stories (2017)

Radio Plays 
Blind Voices (2007)

Stage Plays 

 Full Circle (2007)

Edited Collections 

 Tilling the Hard Soil: Poetry and Prose by South African Writers Living with Disabilities (2010)

References

Year of birth missing (living people)
Living people
Afrikaner people
South African people of Dutch descent
21st-century South African poets
South African male poets
Place of birth missing (living people)
21st-century South African male writers